Guitou is a town in Ruyuan Yao Autonomous County, Guangdong, China.

Etymology
The town is named after Gui Mountain, also known as Guitang Mountain.

Administrative division
As of 2016, the town is divided into one community and fourteen villages: 
 Guitou Community
 Mojia
 Qixingdun
 Hongling
 Daba
 Huang
 Xiaojiang
 Tangtou
 Wanglongwei
 Songwei
 Yangpo
 Yangxi
 Dong'an
 Jun
 Caotianping

History
In 1940, it was known as "Renhe Township".

In 1957, it was the county seat of Ruyuan Yao Autonomous County. In 1958, it was renamed was "Guitou Commune". In 1986, it was upgraded to a town. In November 1988, Yangxi Township separated from the town. In February 2001, Fangdong Forestry Station and Yangxi Township merged into Guitou.

Geography
The town is situated at the northeastern Ruyuan Yao Autonomous County. It borders the towns of Youxi and Bibei in the northwest, Wujiang District and Zhenjiang District in the southeast, and Lechang in the north.

The Wu River winds through the town.

Economy
The local economy is primarily based upon agriculture and local industry. Significant crops include rice and corn. Commercial crops include vegetable, peanut, and chilli. The main industries are paper industry, iron and steel industry, manual processing industry and hydropower industry.

Demographics

As of 2018, the National Bureau of Statistics of China estimates the township's population now to be 38,102.

Transportation
The G0423 Lechang–Guangzhou Expressway, also popularly known as Le–Guang Expressway, is a north–south highway passing through the west of the town limits.

Started from Guitou, the Provincial Highway S250 travels southwest to Rucheng Town.

The Provincial Highway S248, passes across the town northwest to southeast.

Notable people
Hou Andu, general in the Chen dynasty (557–589).

References

Bibliography

 

Divisions of Ruyuan Yao Autonomous County